Gisilia sclerodes is a moth in the family Cosmopterigidae. It is found in South Africa, Namibia, Kenya, Nigeria, the Democratic Republic of Congo, Egypt, Sudan and the United Arab Emirates.

The larvae feed on Acacia nilotica and Acacia arabica.

References

Moths described in 1909
Chrysopeleiinae
Moths of Africa
Moths of Asia